The naval Battle of La Rochelle 1419 was a battle between a Castilian and an allied Flemish-Hanseatic fleet. The Castillian victory resulted in their naval supremacy in the Bay of Biscay. but it also led to a protracted conflict with Flanders and the Hanseatic League, which ended in 1443 with further commercial concessions to Castile.  The battle was notable for the use of guns by the Castilian fleet.

References 

La Rochelle
La Rochelle
1419 in England
La Rochelle
La Rochelle
La Rochelle
1410s in France
14th century in Castile
Hundred Years' War, 1415–1453